NCMC may stand for:

 North Central Michigan College in the state of Michigan, United States of America
 North Central Missouri College in the state of Missouri, United States of America
 National Coalition for Marine Conservation in the United States of America
 National Common Mobility Card in India
 National Crisis Management Centre in New Zealand